Grace Ji-Sun Kim is a Korean-American theologian and Professor of Theology at Earlham School of Religion, Richmond, Indiana. She is best known for books and articles on the social and religious experiences of Korean women immigrants to North America.

Early life 
Kim was born on May 4, 1969, in Seoul, South Korea. She immigrated with her family to London, Ontario in 1975.

Academic life
Kim earned a B.Sc. in Psychology from Victoria University at the University of Toronto, a Master of Divinity degree from Knox College, University of Toronto in 1995, and a Ph.D. in Systematic Theology from St. Michael's College, University of Toronto in 2001.

Kim served on the faculty of Moravian Theological Seminary in Bethlehem, PA from fall 2004 to July 2013. During her time at Moravian, she was promoted to Associate Professor in 2010 and served two terms as Director of the MATS program. Kim was ordained in the Presbyterian Church (USA) on November 13, 2011. She is currently Professor of Theology at Earlham School of Religion in Richmond, Indiana.

Kim received a sabbatical grant for researchers from the Louisville Institute in 2020.

Currently, Kim is Professor of Theology at Earlham School of Religion. She is the author or editor of over 20 books, most recently, Hope in Disarray; Keeping Hope Alive; Reimagining Spirit and Intersectional Theology co-written with Susan Shaw. She is the co-editor of the book series 'Asian Christianity in the Diaspora', published by Palgrave Macmillan.

Personal life 
Kim is currently the host of https://www.christiancentury.org/madang Madang podcast which is hosted by The Christian Century.

Selected publications
2020: Hope in Disarray: Piecing our Lives Together in Faith, Cleveland: The Pilgrim Press. 
 2019: Reimagining Spirit: Light, Wind and Vibration, Eugene: Cascade.
2019: Keeping Hope Alive: Sermons and Speeches of Rev. Jesse Jackson, Maryknoll: Orbis Books.
 2018: Intersectional Theology: An Introductory Guide, with Susan Shaw, Minneapolis: Fortress Press.
2018:The Homebrewed Christianity Guide to the Holy Spirit: Hand-Raisers, Han, and the Holy Ghost, Fortress Press
 2018: Healing Our Broken Humanity: Practices for Revitalizing the Church and Renewing the World. InterVarsity Press. 
2017: Planetary Solidarity: Global Women’s Voices on Doctrine and Climate Justice, co-edited with Hilda Koster, Minneapolis: Fortress Press.
2017: Intercultural Ministry: Hope for a Changing World, co-edited with Jann Aldredge-Clanton, Valley Forge: Judson Press.
2017: Mother Daughter Speak: Lessons on Life. FAR Press. 
2016: Making Peace with the Earth: Action and Advocacy for Climate Justice, Geneva: World Council of Churches Publications.
2015: Embracing the Other: The Transformative Spirit of Love. Grand Rapids: W.B. Eerdmans. 
2015: Christian Doctrines for Global Gender Justice, co-edited with Jenny Daggers, New York:  Palgrave Macmillan.
2015: Here I Am: Faith Stories of Korean American Clergywomen, Valley Forge: Judson Press.
2014: Reimagining with Christian Doctrines: Responding to Global Gender Injustices, co-edited with Jenny Daggers, New York:  Palgrave Macmillan.
2013: Colonialism, Han, and the Transformative Spirit, A Palgrave Pivot Book  
 2013: Proper 13 for Year A, in Preaching God's Transformative Justice: A Lectionary Commentary, With 22 Holy Days of Justice, edited by Ron Lewis, Dale P. Andrews & Dawn Ottoni-Wilhelm (Louisville: Westminster John Knox Press)
 2012: Proper 13 for Year C, in Preaching God's Transformative Justice: A Lectionary Commentary, With 22 Holy Days of Justice, edited by Ron Lewis, Dale P. Andrews & Dawn Ottoni-Wilhelm (Louisville: Westminster John Knox Press) 
 2012: A Perspective on Ezra, Global Perspectives on the Bible, edited by Mark Roncace & Joseph Weaver (Upper Saddle River: Prentice Hall) 
 2012: Uriah, Dictionary of the Bible and Western Culture, co-edited by Michael Gilmour & Mary Ann Beavis (Sheffield: Sheffield Phoenix Press) 
 2011: The Holy Spirit, Chi, and the Other: A Model of Global and Intercultural Pneumatology  : 
 2011: Jürgen Moltmann, in Beyond the Pale: Reading Christian Theology from the Margins, edited by Miguel De La Torre & Stacey M. Floyd-Thomas (Louisville: Westminster John Knox Press) 
 2011: Feasting on the Word, Year A,: Season After Pentecost 2, contributor : 
 2011: Proper 13 for Year B, in Preaching God's Transformative Justice: A Lectionary Commentary, With 22 Holy Days of Justice, edited by Ron Lewis, Dale P. Andrews & Dawn Ottoni Wilhelm (Louisville: Westminster John Knox Press) (contributor) 
 2011: Three Theological Commentaries on 1 Thessalonians 2:1–8, 1 John 3:1–3 & 1 Thessalonians 2:9–13 in Feasting on the Word, Year A: Season After Pentecost 2, Volume XII, edited by David L. Bartlett & Barbara Brown Taylor (Louisville: Westminster John Knox Press) (contributor) 
 2010: The Grace of Sophia: A Korean North American Women's Christology : 
 2010: Asian American Feminist Theology, in Liberation Theologies in the United States: An Introduction edited by Anthony Pinn & Stacey M. Floyd-Thomas (New York: New York University Press, 2010), 131–148 
 2008: What Forms Us: Multiculturalism, the Other and Theology, in Feminist Theology With A Canadian Accent: Canadian Perspectives on Contextual Theology, edited by Mary Ann Beavis, Elaine Guillemin & Barbara Pell (Ottawa: Novalis), 78–99 (contributor) 
 2007: Literary Commentary on Bread for the Journey, by Henri Nouwen, in Masterplots II: Christian Literature, edited by John K. Roth (Pasadena: Salem Press), 215–217 (contributor)
2002: The Grace of Sophia: A Korean North American Women's Christology, Cleveland: The Pilgrim Press.

See also
 Asian feminist theology

References

External links
 Kim's personal blog with links to books and academic site
 Madang Podcast on Spotify
Madang Podcast on Apple
Taste of Seminary
 Book Page on Amazon.com
 AAR Women of Color Scholarship
 AAR Status of Women in the Professions
 AAR Comparative theology Group
 Korean Immigrant Women's Leadership
 Blog in Episcopal Divinity School
 Blog in Feminism and Religion
 Blog on Speaking for Women
 Balancing Motherhood and Scholarship

1969 births
American academics of Korean descent
American theologians
Living people
South Korean emigrants to Canada
University of St. Michael's College alumni
University of Toronto alumni
American women academics
Moravian University faculty
People from Seoul
Earlham College faculty
21st-century American women